"Step 1" is a song by American rappers SleazyWorld Go and Offset. It was released on June 17, 2022 and was produced by Rage Santana. The song gained attention on the video-sharing app TikTok.

Background
In an interview with Billboard, SleazyWorld Go spoke about his collaboration of the song: "Offset actually reached out to me. He likes my music and believes in my sound. He thinks I'm next up and I fuck with whoever fuck with me. I fuck with Offset. It was my record at first, but he liked it and heard it from a TikTok I did. He wanted to hop on there."

SleazyWorld previewed the song on social media before its release. The song gained significant traction on TikTok, where it gave rise to a trend of its own.

Charts

References

2022 singles
2022 songs
SleazyWorld Go songs
Offset (rapper) songs
Songs written by Offset (rapper)